Sarah Weiss Maudi (born 1975) is an international lawyer, educator, and advocate. She is currently the Legal Advisor of Israel’s Permanent Mission to the United Nations.

Maudi is a graduate of the Ida Crown Jewish Academy, University of Pennsylvania, Harvard, and New York University.

Career 
She was an associate lawyer in a top corporate law firm in Israel, with a specialty in international contract law. She also taught public international law at the Ono Academic College in Israel. Before that, she worked at the Israel Ministry of Justice’s International Treaties and Litigation Department and as the director of the General International Law Department at the Israel Ministry of Foreign Affairs. At the Foreign Ministry, Maudi was the expert on maritime and humanitarian law.

Maudi is the founder of the Women in Diplomacy network.

In October 2020, Maudi was appointed as the UN Legal Committee’s vice chair for the 75th General Assembly. She represents the Western Europe and Others Group (WEOG) and be the first Israeli woman to fill the role. She is a member of the American Society of International Law and has spoken at meetings, including the 2011 proceedings following the flotilla incident. In 2019, she was the Chair of the Israeli delegation to the United Nation’s Intergovernmental conference on the conservation and sustainable use of marine biological diversity of areas beyond national jurisdiction.

Publications 
Maudi has published various articles on international law including a chapter in International Maritime Borders on the Israel-Cyprus maritime agreement she negotiated on Israel’s behalf, an article on legal aspects of the 2010 flotilla incident in the American Society of International Law; a chapter on international maritime law in Robbie Sabel and Yael Ronen’s (eds) International Law Textbook (in Hebrew).

She was the lead contributor on the Israeli team authoring the recent Universal Periodic Review human rights report, Israel’s government report on the 2014 Military Operation in Gaza and Israel’s recent submission  to the International Court of Justice on the Chagos Advisory Opinion proceedings.

References 

1975 births
Living people
University of Pennsylvania alumni
Harvard University alumni
New York University alumni